The following is an index of Somalia-related articles.



A
Aamin Ambulance
Adal Sultanate
Agriculture in Somalia
Ajuran Sultanate
Awdal

B
Badbaado (refugee camp)
Badhan, Sanaag
Beled Hawo
Baidoa
Bakool
Banaadir
Bardera
Bari, Somalia
Bay, Somalia
Beledweyne
Benadiri people
Berbera
Borama
Borama alphabet
Bosaso
Bravanese people
British Somaliland
Bu'aale
Bulhar
Burao
Burdhubo
Burjiko

C
Central Bank of Somalia
Cinema of Somalia
Coat of arms of Somalia
Communications in Somalia

D
Dahabshiil
Darod
Dervish State
Dhusamareb
Dir (clan)
Dolow

E
Economy of Somaliland
Elections in Somalia
El Ayo
El Wak
Erigavo
Eyle people

F
Fafahdhun
Football in Somalia
Flag of Puntland

G
Galmudug
Galguduud
Galkayo
Garbahaarey
Garoowe
Gedo
Geledi Sultanate
Geography of Somalia

H
Hadaftimo
Hadaftimo District
Hargeisa
Hawiye
Heis (town)
Hiraab Imamate
Hiran
History of Somalia
Human rights in Somalia

I
Injera
Isaaq
Italian Somalians
Italian Somaliland
Italian East Africa

J
Jowhar
Jubaland

K
Kaddare alphabet
Kismayo

L
Las Anod
Las Khorey
LGBT rights in Puntland
LGBT rights in Somalia
LGBT rights in Somaliland
List of political parties in Somalia
List of Somalis
Lower Juba
Lower Shabelle
Luuq
Luuq District

M
Majeerteen Sultanate
Media of Somalia
Merca
Merca District
Middle Juba
Middle Shabelle
Mogadishu
Mogadishu University
Mudug

N
Nugal, Somalia

O
Ogaden
Oil exploration in Puntland
Osmanya alphabet

P
Piracy in Somalia
Politics of Somalia
Port of Berbera
Port of Bosaso
Port of Kismayo
Port of Las Khorey
Port of Mogadishu
President of Somalia
Prime Minister of Somalia
Puntland

R
Rahanweyn
Religion in Somalia
Refugees of Somalia

S
Saakow
Sabayad
Salweyn
Sanaag
Second Battle of Mogadishu
Second Italo-Abyssinian War
Middle Shabele
Somali architecture
Somali aristocratic and court titles
Somali art
Somali Bantu
Somali cuisine
Somali Democratic Movement
Somali language
Somali National Movement
Somali National Front
Somali National University
Somali Patriotic Movement
Somali people
Somali Revolutionary Socialist Party
Somali Salvation Democratic Front
Somalia
Somaliland
Sool
Sultanate of Hobyo
Sultanate of Mogadishu
Supreme Islamic Courts Council

T
Togdheer
Tourism in Somalia
Transitional Federal Government
Transitional Federal Parliament
Transitional National Government
Transport in Somalia

U
United Somali Congress
University of Gedo
University of Somalia

W
Walashma dynasty
Woqooyi Galbeed

X
Xeer

See also

Lists of country-related topics - similar lists for other countries

Somalia